Joseph V. Noble (April 3, 1920 – September 22, 2007) was an American museum administrator, antiquities collector, and self-trained ceramic archaeologist.

Early life
Joseph Veach Noble was born on April 3, 1920, in Philadelphia, Pennsylvania. He pursued premedical studies at the University of Pennsylvania. While still in school, he began working as a cinematographer for De Frenes & Company, making documentary films. He briefly worked for Philco Corporation, one of the first television stations in Philadelphia, before enlisting in the United States Army where he served in the Signal Corps Photographic Center, attaining the position of Assistant Chief of the Camera Branch. After the war, Noble returned to De Frenes & Company for a time, then became General Manager at Murphy-Lillis, a commercial film studio. He served as Executive Vice-President at Film Counselors, Inc., from 1950 to 1956. During this time he developed an interest in and began collecting Greek vases and other antiquities.

Career
In 1956, Noble was hired by Metropolitan Museum of Art Director James Rorimer to join his administrative team as Operating Administrator, a position he held until 1967. He subsequently served as Chairman of the Administrative Committee (1966-1967) and Vice-Director of Administration (1967-1970) at The Metropolitan Museum of Art. In his position as Operating Administrator, Noble oversaw curatorial and administrative functions including human resources, construction, acquisitions, and visitor services. With his 1967 promotion to Vice-Director of Administration Noble’s role changed slightly. According to a New York Times article on Thomas Hoving’s appointment as Director of the Metropolitan, Noble’s new position was “designed to direct the business of the museum and to lessen the burden of the director.” Noble, however, in a 1994 oral history interview described his change in title as “technical” and noted that his “duties were virtually the same.” He further stated that “Director Tom Hoving’s job is to pull the Museum up to the sky; it is my job to hold its feet on the ground. Between the two, we will stretch the Metropolitan Museum of Art.”.

As an antiquities collector and self-trained ceramic archaeologist, Noble was instrumental in exposing the three Etruscan terracotta warriors acquired by the Museum in 1916, 1917, and 1921 as modern forgeries. In 1967, he suggested that a Greek bronze horse in the Museum’s collection was also a forgery, though this assertion was controversial and was refuted in 1972 when a panel of experts concluded that the statue was a genuine antiquity.

He left the Metropolitan in 1970 to become Director of the Museum of the City of New York, where he served until 1985. He also served as the President of the American Association of Museums from 1975 to 1978. In 1986, the Tampa Museum of Art acquired the Noble collection of Classical Antiquities. In 1970 sculptor Joseph Kiselewski created a brass medallion featuring Noble's profile. The medallion is in a collection housed in the American Heritage Bank in Browerville, Minnesota.

Publications
An Inquiry into the Forgery of the Etruscan Terracotta Warriors in the Metropolitan Museum of Art. Dietrich von Bothmer and Joseph Veach Noble. Papers of the Metropolitan Museum of Art No. 11. January 1, 1961.
The Techniques of Painted Attic Pottery. Joseph Veach Noble, Metropolitan Museum of Art (New York, N.Y.) Watson-Guptill Publications, 1965.
"The Forgery of our Greek Bronze Horse": The Metropolitan Museum of Art Bulletin, v. 26, no. 6 (February, 1968).

References

1920 births
2007 deaths
United States Army personnel of World War II
People from Philadelphia
People associated with the Metropolitan Museum of Art
United States Army officers
University of Pennsylvania alumni

External links
Oral history interview with Joseph Veach Noble, 1994 Feb. 3-Feb. 28 from The Metropolitan Museum of Art Archives, New York.